Smerby Castle, also known as Island Muller Castle, is a ruined fortified house on a promontory known as Isla Muller, Kintyre, Argyll and Bute, Scotland, north of Campbeltown. The site is protected as a scheduled monument.

History

16th century
Ranald MacDonald was granted Smerby Castle from his father James MacDonald, 6th of Dunnyveg.

Angus MacDonald, 8th of Dunnyveg was kept as a prisoner in chains at Smerby Castle in 1598 after James MacDonald was sent to seek his fathers submission to King James V of Scotland. Angus suffered burns after his Kintyre house Askomull was burnt down by his son James and was subsequently captured.

Notes

References

Clan Donald
Scheduled Ancient Monuments in Argyll and Bute
Ruined castles in Argyll and Bute
Kintyre